A unit-linked insurance plan is a product offered by insurance companies that, unlike a pure insurance policy, gives investors both insurance and investment under a single integrated plan.

History

The first unit-linked insurance plan was launched by Unit Trust of India.  With the Government of India opening up the insurance sector to foreign investors in 2001 and the subsequent issue of major guidelines for unit-linked insurance plans by the Insurance Regulatory and Development Authority, now the Insurance Regulatory and Development Authority of India, in 2005, several insurance companies forayed into the business leading to an overabundance of unit-linked insurance plan schemes being launched to serve the investment needs of those looking to invest in an investment cum insurance product.

Working principle

A unit-linked insurance plan is essentially a combination of insurance and an investment vehicle.  A portion of the premium paid by the policyholder is utilized to provide insurance coverage to the policyholder and the remaining portion is invested in equity and debt instruments.  The aggregate premiums collected by the insurance company providing such plans is pooled and invested in varying proportions of debt and equity securities in a similar manner to mutual funds.  Each policyholder has the option to select a personalized investment mix based on his/her investment needs and risk appetite.
Like mutual funds, each policyholder's Unit-Linked Insurance Plan holds a certain number of fund units, each of which has a net asset value that is declared on a daily basis. The net asset value is the value upon which net rates of return on unit-linked insurance plans are determined.  The net asset value varies from one plan to another based on market conditions and fund performance.

Features

A portion of premium goes towards mortality charges, i.e., providing life cover. The remaining portion gets invested into funds of the policyholder's choice. Invested funds continue to earn market linked returns.

Policy holders can make use of features such as top-up facilities, switching between various funds during the tenure of the policy, reduce or increase the level of protection, options to surrender, additional riders to enhance coverage and returns as well as tax benefits.

Types

Depending upon the death benefit, there are broadly two types of unit-linked insurance plans. Under type I, the nominee gets the higher of sum assured or fund value while under type II, the nominee of the policy holder gets the sum of sum assured and fund value in the event of demise of the policy holder.

There are a variety of plans to choose from based on the investment objectives of the investor, risk appetite, and investment horizon. Some plans play it safe by allocating a larger portion of the invested capital in debt instruments while others purely invest in equity. Again, all this is based on the type of plan chosen for investment and the investor preference and risk appetite.

Charges

Unlike traditional insurance policies, unit-linked insurance plans have a list of applicable charges that are deducted from the payable premium. The notable ones include policy administration charges, premium allocation charges, fund switching charges, mortality charges, and a policy surrender or withdrawal charge. Some insurers also charge a "guarantee charge" as a percentage of the fund value for built in minimum guarantee under the policy.

Risks

Since plan returns are directly linked to market performance and the investment risk in investment portfolio is borne entirely by the policy holder, one needs to thoroughly understand the risks involved and one’s own risk absorption capacity before deciding to invest.

Providers

There are several public and private sector insurance providers that either operate solo or have partnered with foreign insurance companies to sell unit-linked insurance plans in India. The public insurance provider include LIC of India while some of the private insurance providers include Aegon Life, Canara, Edelweiss Tokio Life Insurance, Reliance Life, SBI Life, ICICI Prudential, HDFC Life, Bajaj Allianz, Aviva Life Insurance, Max life insurance, Kotak Mahindra Life, and DHFL Pramerica Life Insurance. FWU is covering the Europe market.

Tax benefits 
Investments in unit-linked insurance plans are eligible for tax benefit up to a maximum of Rs 1.5 lacs under Section 80C of the Income Tax Act.

Maturity proceeds are also exempt from income tax. There is a caveat. The Sum Assured or the minimum death benefit must be at least 10 times the annual premium. If this condition is not met, the benefit under Section 80C shall be capped at 10% of Sum Assured while the maturity proceeds will not be exempt from income tax.

References

Insurance in India
Tax-advantaged savings plans in India
1971 introductions